The 2019–20 season was GNK Dinamo Zagreb's 29th season in the Croatian First Division and 107th year in existence as a football club. In addition to the domestic league, Dinamo Zagreb participated in this season's editions of the Croatian Cup, the Croatian Super Cup, and the UEFA Champions League. The season covered the period from 1 July 2019 to 24 July 2020.

Players

Current squad

Out on loan

Pre-season and friendlies

Competitions

Overview

Prva HNL

League table

Results summary

Result round by round

Matches

Croatian Cup

Croatian Super Cup

UEFA Champions League

Second qualifying round

Third qualifying round

Play-off round

Group stage

Player seasonal records

Goals

Clean Sheets

Appearances and goals

References

External links

GNK Dinamo Zagreb seasons
GNK Dinamo Zagreb
GNK Dinamo Zagreb
Croatian football championship-winning seasons